Sebastian Roth (born 20 September 1971), known by his stage name as Sin With Sebastian, is a German musician/singer/songwriter. Sin With Sebastian came to prominence in 1995 with the Europe-wide hit, "Shut Up (and Sleep with Me)", which made it up to number-one in Spain, Austria, Finland, Mexico, and Top 10 in most European countries . In addition, it reached number 26 on the U.S. Billboard Hot Dance Club Play chart No.44 in the UK Singles Chart. The single and following album, Golden Boy, were co-produced by Inga Humpe and Sebastian Roth.

Musical career
Sin with Sebastian released three singles and one album between 1995 and 1997. Sin with Sebastian reappeared in 2007 with a new line-up, adding guitarist Tom Steinbrecher, to release two singles: Fuck You (I am in Love) and That's all? I'm not satisfied.

Awards and nominations
{| class=wikitable
|-
! Year !! Awards !! Work !! Category !! Result
|-
| 1995
| MTV Europe Music Awards
| rowspan=2|Himself
| Best Dance
| 
|-
| 1996
| ECHO Awards
| Best National Dance Act 
|

Discography

Albums 
 Golden Boy (1995)
 The Unreleased Album (demo recordings 1997) (1997)
 Punk Pop! EP (2008)
 Punk POP! 2  EP (2010)

Singles 
 "Shut Up (and Sleep with Me)" (1995)
 "Golden Boy" (1995)
 "He Belongs to Me" (1997) (with Marianne Rosenberg)
 "Fuck You (I Am in Love)" (2007)
 "That's All? (I'm Not Satisfied)" (2010)
 "Wake Up" (2011) (with Dolly Buster)
 "Put It On (Come On) Festival Radio Edit" (2019)

References

External links
Official website

Living people
People from Neustadt an der Weinstraße
German pop musicians
German male singers
German pop singers
German songwriters
Eurodance musicians
1971 births